Eilean nan Ròn is an island near Skerray, in the north of Sutherland, Scotland. An estimated 350 seal pups are born here annually.

History
Eilean nan Ròn was populated for many years. 73 people lived there in 1881 and 30 in 1931 but it has been uninhabited since 1938. The final evacuation list contained nine people from the Mackay family – Christina Bella Mackay, Hector Sinclair Mackay, Jessie Ann Mackay, Willie John Mackay, Hugh Campbell Mackay, Donald Mackay, Ina Mackay, Chrissie Dolina Mackay and Christina Mackay.

The ruins of a settlement can be seen from the Skerray and in the waist of the island, between Mol na Coinnle ("Pebble Beach of the Candles") and Mol Mòr ("big pebble beach").

Geography and geology
Eilean nan Ròn is not one of the Hebrides, which lie off the west coast of mainland Scotland. As Rev. Wilson wrote in 1882:

It looks like two islands, is mostly engirt with high precipitous rocks, includes a low tract of very fertile soil.

There are several islets and islands off Eilean nan Ròn. These include the tidal Eilean Iosal (low island), and beyond it Meall Thailm (or "Meall Holm"). To the south west is the dully named An Innis ("small island"). The Rabbit Islands are in Tongue Bay to the south west.

Wildlife
As the name implies, Eilean nan Ròn is popular with grey seals, that come here in their hundreds each autumn to pup. About 350 calves are born each year. The island also has large numbers of seabirds, and sheep, which were left when the Island was evacuated.

See also

 List of islands of Scotland
 List of outlying islands of Scotland

Footnotes

References
 

Islands of Sutherland
Sites of Special Scientific Interest in North West Sutherland
Uninhabited islands of Highland (council area)
Natural arches of Scotland